Daasanach may refer to:
the Daasanach people
the Daasanach language